Alex Browne may refer to:

 Alex Browne (filmmaker), American documentary film producer
 Alex Browne (Australian footballer) (born 1992), Australian rules footballer

See also 
 Alex Brown (disambiguation)
Alexander Browne (disambiguation)